Silverhorn Mountain is a  mountain summit located in the Mistaya River valley of Banff National Park, in the Canadian Rockies of Alberta, Canada. Silverhorn Mountain is situated 3.9 kilometres southeast of Mount Weed, and 3.1 km northwest of Observation Peak. Silverhorn stands directly east across the Mistaya River valley from Mount Patterson, and both are prominent features seen from the Icefields Parkway.

History

The mountain was given its descriptive name in 1899 by Rev. Charles Lathrop Noyes (1851-1923), a member of the Appalachian Mountain Club who climbed in the Rockies and made several first ascents, such as Mount Balfour, Mount Gordon, and Mount Lefroy. The mountain's name was officially adopted in 1924 by the Geographical Names Board of Canada.

Geology

Like other mountains in Banff Park, Silverhorn is composed of sedimentary rock laid down during the Precambrian to Jurassic periods. Formed in shallow seas, this sedimentary rock was pushed east and over the top of younger rock during the Laramide orogeny.

Climate

Based on the Köppen climate classification, Silverhorn Mountain is located in a subarctic climate with cold, snowy winters, and mild summers. Temperatures can drop below -20 °C with wind chill factors below -30 °C. Precipitation runoff from Silverhorn Mountain drains west into the Mistaya River, or east into Dolomite Creek which is a tributary of the Siffleur River.

See also

List of mountains of Canada
Geography of Alberta
Geology of the Rocky Mountains

References

External links
 Parks Canada web site: Banff National Park
 Climbing Silverhorn Mountain at Explor8ion.com
 Silverhorn Mountain: weather forecast

Two-thousanders of Alberta
Mountains of Banff National Park
Canadian Rockies